"So Help Me Girl" is a song written by Howard Perdew and Andy Spooner and recorded by American country music singer Joe Diffie. It was released in January 1995 as the third single from his fourth studio album, Third Rock from the Sun (1994). The song reached number two on the Billboard Hot Country Singles & Tracks chart, where it debuted at number 59 for the week of February 4, 1995, and number 84 on the Billboard Hot 100.

Music video
The music video for "So Help Me Girl" was directed by Gerry Wenner and premiered in early 1995.

Charts

Weekly charts

Year-end charts

Gary Barlow version

"So Help Me Girl" was covered by English singer and songwriter Gary Barlow, and released as the third single from his debut solo album, Open Road (1997), in the United Kingdom on July 14, 1997, and as the lead single from the album in the US later in the year. Following the success of the album in the UK, Barlow signed a record deal with Arista records for it to be released in the US. He reworked the album for the American market and subsequently released a remixed version of "So Help Me Girl" as the lead single there. Produced by David Foster, it was released in 65 countries around the world and topped the charts in 13 countries. In the UK, it peaked at number 11 on the UK Singles Chart. And in the US, the single peaked at number 44 on the Billboard Hot 100, number three on the Billboard Adult Contemporary Chart and number 58 on the Billboard Radio Charts.

Critical reception
Larry Flick from Billboard gave the American version of "So Help Me Girl" a positive review, saying that it did not stray from Barlow's work in the group Take That. He also praised his "boyish teen-idol charm" and "flexible tenor." A reviewer from Music Week rated it three out of five, adding that "the song's Nashville roots are barely discernible on this David Foster update which turns it into a swoony, low-key ballad to give Barlow another hit." David Sinclair from The Times wrote, "Old country song given a dreary, pop ballad treatment."

Music video
Two music videos were released for So Help Me Girl. The first video, accompanying the European release of the single, features Barlow taking a girl home after a night out, and waking up the next morning and realising that he has cheated on his girlfriend. He performs the majority of the song in the bedroom, before moving to a piano for the final scenes, which depict a fight between his girlfriend and the girl he took home. The second video, accompanying the American release of the single, begins with Barlow sitting alone on a bridge and throwing a rose into the water below, whilst a mysterious woman looks on. He then continues to perform the song whilst looking through the windows of a darkened house, where he spots a young girl. The video continues with Barlow walking through a lighted tunnel of moving cars, before returning to the house and performing the final line of the song to the girl personally.

Track listings

 UK CD1
 "So Help Me Girl" (4:28)   
 "Million To One" (3:25)  
 "Offer My Peace" (3:56)   
 "So Help Me Girl" (C Swing Mix) (4:30)

 UK CD2
 "So Help Me Girl" (4:28)   
 "So Help Me Girl" (Peter Mokran Mix) (4:38)  
 "Interview" (11:35)

 Cassette / 7" Jukebox Vinyl
 "So Help Me Girl" (4:28)   
 "Million To One" (3:25)

 American single
 "So Help Me Girl" (US Edit) (4:38)   
 "Back for Good" (Live) (4:01)

Charts

References

1995 singles
1997 singles
Joe Diffie songs
Gary Barlow songs
Song recordings produced by David Foster
Song recordings produced by Bob Montgomery (songwriter)
Epic Records singles
Arista Records singles
Country ballads
Pop ballads
Music videos credited to Alan Smithee
1994 songs